Alejandro Suárez Castro (born 27 September 1993) is a Spanish professional basketball player who plays as a power forward.

Career
Suárez began his career in the junior team of Joventut, playing with them in the seasons of 2009–10 and 2010–11. In 2011, he was loaned out to CB Prat, the reserve team of Joventut. Over the 2014–15 season, he averaged 4.8 points in 34 games for the former. In 2015, Real Madrid paid the termination clause in his contract, and he signed a three-year contract with them. On 13 August 2015, he was loaned to Dominion Bilbao Basket. On 16 August 2017, he was loaned out to Tecnyconta Zaragoza.

On July 31, 2018, Suárez signed with Portuguese club Benfica.

On August 7, 2019, Suárez signed by Iberostar Tenerife. He averaged 2.7 points and 1.4 rebounds per game. He signed with Monbus Obradoiro on July 27, 2020. Suárez signed a three-year extension with the team on October 4, 2021.

References

External links
 
 Álex Suárez at acb.com 
 Álex Suárez at eurobasket.com
 Álex Suárez at euroleague.net
 Álex Suárez at draftexpress.com
 Álex Suárez at nbadraft.net

1993 births
Living people
Basket Zaragoza players
Bilbao Basket players
CB Canarias players
CB Prat players
Joventut Badalona players
Liga ACB players
Obradoiro CAB players
Power forwards (basketball)
Real Madrid Baloncesto players
S.L. Benfica basketball players
Spanish men's basketball players
Sportspeople from Menorca
People from Mahón